Paul Rawlins (born c. 1965) is an American short story writer, and editor.

Life
He graduated from Brigham Young University with a BA, 1989, and an MA, 1992.  His fiction appeared in Glimmer Train, Southeast Review, Sycamore Review, Tampa Review, and Prism. He lives in Salt Lake City.

Awards
 PRISM International Short Fiction Award
 Utah Arts Council Award
 Flannery O'Connor Award for Short Fiction

Works

The matter of these hours, Brigham Young University. Dept. of English., 1992

Jobs
He has worked for many companies. His first job was taking inventory and eventually he became a writer/editor. He wrote at least one book and other articles in magazines.

References

American short story writers
Brigham Young University alumni
1960s births
Living people